Jamie Monroe Brown (born March 31, 1977) is a relief pitcher formerly in Major League Baseball. He bats and throws right-handed.

Brown played briefly for the Boston Red Sox in the  season. In four games pitched, he posted a 5.87 ERA with six strikeouts and four walks in 7-1/3 innings without a decision.

Following his major league career, Brown has played for the Hanshin Tigers, Samsung Lions (–), and LG Twins.

References

External links

KBO foreign players
Career statistics and player information from Korea Baseball Organization

1977 births
Akron Aeros players
American expatriate baseball players in Japan
American expatriate baseball players in South Korea
Baseball players from Mississippi
Boston Red Sox players
Buffalo Bisons (minor league) players
Hanshin Tigers players
KBO League pitchers
Kinston Indians players
LG Twins players
Living people
Major League Baseball pitchers
Northwest Florida State Raiders baseball players
Pawtucket Red Sox players
Samsung Lions players
Sportspeople from Meridian, Mississippi